is a 1968 Japanese film directed by Heinosuke Gosho. It is a drama about a geisha who becomes independent and opens a soup stand. It is based on the novel of the same name by Yumie Hiraiwa.

Cast
 Junko Ikeuchi as Chikako Muroto
 Kunie Tanaka as Shoji Ogawa
 Masakazu Tamura as Tomoichiro Sakimura
 Kazuo Kitamura as Kiyoo Ota
 Etsuko Ichihara as Kazuyo Inuyama
 Hisano Yamaoki as Suga Murai
 Kei Satō as Murata
 Keizo Kawasaki as Kiritani
 Eijirō Tōno as Ogawa

Release
A Woman and the Beancurd Soup was released in Japan on 14 February 1968 where it was distributed by Toho.

Reception
Hisano Yamaoka won the Best Supporting Actress award from the Mainichi Film Concours for her work in this film, as well as The House of Sleeping Virgins and The Bamboozlers.

See also
List of Japanese films of 1968

References

Footnotes

Sources

External links
 

Japanese drama films
Toho films
1960s Japanese-language films
Films directed by Heinosuke Gosho
1960s Japanese films